The Convair F-102 Delta Dagger was an American interceptor aircraft designed and manufactured by Convair.
Built as part of the backbone of the United States Air Force's air defenses in the late 1950s, it entered service in 1956. Its main purpose was to intercept invading Soviet strategic bomber fleets (primarily the Tupolev Tu-95) during the Cold War.  A total of 1,000 F-102s were built.

A member of the Century Series, the F-102 was the USAF's first operational supersonic interceptor and delta-wing fighter. It used an internal weapons bay to carry both guided missiles and rockets. As originally designed, it could not achieve Mach 1 supersonic flight until redesigned with area ruling. The F-102 replaced subsonic fighter types such as the Northrop F-89 Scorpion, and by the 1960s, it saw limited service in the Vietnam War in bomber escort and ground-attack roles. It was supplemented by McDonnell F-101 Voodoos and, later, by McDonnell Douglas F-4 Phantom IIs.

Many of the F-102s were transferred from the active duty Air Force to the Air National Guard by the mid-to-late 1960s, and, with the exception of those examples converted to unmanned QF-102 Full Scale Aerial Target (FSAT) drones, the type was totally retired from operational service in 1976. The follow-on replacement was the Mach-2 Convair F-106 Delta Dart, which was an extensive redesign of the F-102.

Design and development

Initial designs and problems

On 8 October 1948, the board of senior officers of the U.S. Air Force (USAF) made recommendations that the service organize a competition for a new interceptor scheduled to enter service in 1954; as such, the all-new design would initially be dubbed the "1954 Ultimate Interceptor". Four months later, on 4 February 1949, the USAF approved the recommendation and prepared to hold the competition the following year. In November 1949, the Air Force decided that the new aircraft would be built around a fire-control system (FCS). The FCS was to be designed before the airframe to ensure compatibility. The airframe and FCS together were called the weapon system.

In January 1950, the USAF Air Materiel Command issued request for proposals (RFPs) to 50 companies for the FCS, of which 18 responded. By May, the list was revised downward to 10. Meanwhile, a board at the U.S. Department of Defense headed by Major General Gordon P. Saville reviewed the proposals, and distributed some to the George E. Valley-led Air Defense Engineering Committee. Following recommendations by the committee to the Saville Board, the proposals were further reduced to two competitors, Hughes Aircraft and North American Aviation. Although the Valley Committee thought it was best to award the contract to both companies, Hughes was chosen by Saville and his team on 2 October 1950.

Proposals for the airframe were issued on 18 June 1950, and in January 1951 six manufacturers responded. On 2 July 1954, three companies, Convair, Republic and Lockheed won the right to build a mockup. Until then, Convair had done research into delta-winged aircraft, experimenting with different designs, two of which fell under the name P-92. Of the three, the best design was to win the production contract under the name "Project MX-1554". In the end, Convair emerged as the victor with its design, designated "XF-102", after Lockheed dropped out and Republic built only a mockup. The development of three different designs was too expensive and in November, only Convair was allowed to continue with its Model 8-80. To speed development, it was proposed to equip the prototypes and pre-production aircraft with the less-powerful Westinghouse J40 turbojet. Continued delays to the J67 and MA-1 (formerly "MX-1179") FCS led to the decision to place an interim aircraft with the J40 and a simpler fire control system (dubbed "E-9") into production as the F-102A. This aircraft was intended to be temporary, pending the development of the F-102B, which would employ the more advanced Curtiss-Wright J67, a licensed derivative of the Bristol-Siddeley Olympus which was still in development. The F-102B would later evolve to become the F-106A, dubbed the "Ultimate Interceptor".

The prototype YF-102 made its first flight on 23 October 1953, at Edwards AFB, but was lost in an accident nine days later. The second aircraft flew on 11 January 1954, confirming a dismal performance. Transonic drag was much higher than expected, and the aircraft was limited to Mach 0.98 (i.e. subsonic), with a ceiling of 48,000 ft (14,630 m), far below the requirements.

Major redesign

To solve the problem and save the F-102, Convair embarked on a major redesign, incorporating the recently discovered area rule, while at the same time simplifying production and maintenance. The redesign entailed lengthening the fuselage by 11 ft (3.35 m), being "pinched" at the midsection (dubbed the "Coke Bottle configuration"), with two large fairings on either side of the engine nozzle, with revised intakes and a new, narrower canopy. A more powerful model of the J57 was fitted, and the aircraft structure was lightened.

At the same time the wing was redesigned, being made thinner and wider. The leading edge was given a conical droop, with the apex at the root, to improve handling at low speeds. Because the droop remained within the shock cone of the leading edge, the drag rise at supersonic speeds was minimal. A second, inboard fence was added.

The first revised aircraft, designated YF-102A flew on 20 December 1954, 118 days after the redesign started, exceeding Mach 1 the next day. The revised design demonstrated a speed of Mach 1.22 and a ceiling of 53,000 ft (16,154 m). These improvements were sufficient for the Air Force to allow production of the F-102, with a new production contract signed in March 1954.

The production F-102A had the Hughes MC-3 fire control system, later upgraded in service to the MG-10. It had a three-segment internal weapons bay under the fuselage for air-to-air missiles. Initial armament was three pairs of GAR-1/2/3/4 (Later re-designated as AIM-4) Falcon missiles, which included both infrared homing and semi-active radar homing variants.  The doors of the two forward bays each had tubes for 12 FFARs (for a total of 24) with initially 2 in (5.1 cm) being fitted and later 2.75 in (70 mm) replacing them. The F-102 was later upgraded to allow the carrying of up to two GAR-11/AIM-26 Nuclear Falcon missiles in the center bay. The larger size of this weapon required redesigned center bay doors with no rocket tubes. Plans were considered to fit the MB-1 Genie nuclear rocket to the design, but although a Genie was test fired from a YF-102A in May 1956, it was never adopted.

The F-102 received several major modifications during its operational lifetime, with most airframes being retrofitted with infrared search/tracking systems, radar warning receivers, transponders, backup artificial horizons, and improvements to the fire control system. A proposed close-support version (never built) would have incorporated, in addition, an internal Gatling gun, an extra two hardpoints for bombs (in addition to the two underwing pylons for drop tanks that were fitted to all production F-102s), bigger internal fuel tanks, and an in-flight-refueling probe. The F-102 was subsonic when fitted with drop tanks.

To train F-102A pilots, the TF-102A trainer was developed, with 111 eventually manufactured. The aircraft was designed with side-by-side seating to facilitate pilot training, a popular concept in the 1950s (also used with the American Cessna T-37, British Hawker Hunter T.7 and English Electric Lightning T.4, among others). This required a redesign of the cockpit and a nose almost as wide as that of a Convair 340 commercial airliner. The new nose introduced buffeting, the source of which was traced to the bulbous canopy. Vortex generators were added to the top of the canopy to prevent the buffet which had started at about Mach 0.72. The intake ducts were revised as the inlets were repositioned. Despite the many changes, the aircraft was combat-capable, although this variant was predictably slower, reaching only subsonic speeds in level flight.

The numerous inherent design and technical limitations of the F-102 led to a proposed successor, initially known as the F-102B "Ultimate Interceptor". The improved design, in which the proposed Curtiss-Wright J67 jet engine was eventually replaced by a Pratt & Whitney J75, underwent so many aerodynamic changes (including variable-geometry inlets) that it essentially became an entirely new aircraft and hence was redesignated and produced as the F-106 Delta Dart. Convair would also use a delta wing design in the Mach 2 class Convair B-58 Hustler bomber.

Operational history

Introduction to service
The first operational service of the F-102A was with the 327th Fighter-Interceptor Squadron at George Air Force Base, in April 1956, and eventually a total of 889 F-102As were built, production ending in September 1958. TF-102s and F-102s were used in the 1960s by the Air Defense Command (ADC) at Perrin AFB, Texas to train new F-102 pilots. They also provided platform training on flight characteristics of delta-winged aircraft for pilots who were destined to fly the B-58 Hustler bomber for the Strategic Air Command (SAC).

The F-102's official name, "Delta Dagger", was never used in common parlance, with the aircraft being universally known as the "Deuce." The TF-102 was known as the "Tub" because of its wider fuselage with side-by-side twin seating.

During the time the F-102A was in service, several new wing designs were used to experiment with the application of increased conical camber to the wings. Ultimately, a design was selected that actually increased elevon area, reduced takeoff speed, improved the supersonic L/D ratio and increased the aircraft's ceiling to 56,000 ft (17,069 m). A modification was required to the landing gear doors due to the wing redesign.

The Air Defense Command had F-102 Delta Daggers in service in 1960 and the type continued to serve in large numbers with both Air Force and Air National Guard units well into the 1970s. George W. Bush, later President of the United States, flew the F-102 in the 147th Fighter Interceptor Group based at Ellington AFB in Houston, Texas as part of his Texas Air National Guard service from 1968 to 1972.

Vietnam War service
The F-102 served in the Vietnam War, flying fighter patrols and serving as bomber escorts. A total of 14 aircraft were lost in Vietnam: one to air-to-air combat, several to ground fire and the remainder to accidents.

Initially, F-102 detachments began to be sent to bases in Southeast Asia in 1962 after radar contacts detected by ground radars were thought to possibly be North Vietnamese  Vietnam People's Air Force (VPAF) Il-28 "Beagle" bombers  considered to be a credible threat in that time period. The F-102s were sent to Thailand and other nearby countries to intercept these aircraft if they threatened South Vietnam.

Later on, Boeing B-52 Stratofortress strikes, codenamed "Arc Light", were escorted by F-102s based in the theater. It was during one of these missions that an F-102 was shot down by a VPAF Mikoyan-Gurevich MiG-21 using an AA-2 Atoll heat-seeking missile. The MiGs approached undetected, and one of the F-102s was hit by an air-to-air missile, which did not explode immediately, but remained lodged in the aft end of the aircraft, causing stability problems. As the pilot reported the problem to his wingman, the wingman observed the damaged Delta Dagger explode in midair, killing the pilot. This was the only air-to-air loss for the F-102 during the Vietnam War. The other F-102 pilot fired AIM-4 missiles at the departing MiG-21s, but no hit was recorded.

The F-102 was employed in the air-to-ground role with limited success, although neither the aircraft nor the training for its pilots were designed for that role. The 509th Fighter-Interceptor Squadron's Deuces arrived at Da Nang Air Base, 4 August 1964 from Clark Air Base, Philippines. The interceptor was equipped with 24 2.75 in (70 mm) FFARs in the fuselage bay doors. These could be used to good effect against various types of North Vietnamese targets in daylight. At night it proved less dangerous to use heat-seeking Falcon missiles in conjunction with the F-102's nose-mounted IRST (Infrared Search & Track) on nighttime harassment raids along the Ho Chi Minh Trail. Some F-102As were configured to accommodate a single AIM-26 Super Falcon in each side bay in lieu of the two conventional AIM-4 Falcons. Operations with both the F-102A and TF-102A two-seaters (which were used in a Forward Air Control role because its two seats and 2.75 in/70 mm rockets offered good versatility for the mission) continued in Vietnam until 1968 when all F-102s were returned to the United States.

Later use
In 1973, six aircraft were converted to target drones as QF-102As and later PQM-102Bs (simulating MiG-21 threat aircraft) under a Full Scale Aerial Target (FSAT) project known as Pave Deuce. Eventually, the program converted hundreds of F-102s for use as target drones for newer fighter aircraft, as well as testing of the U.S. Army's Patriot missile system.

The F-102 and TF-102 were exported overseas to both Turkey and Greece. The Turkish F-102s saw combat missions during the 1974 Turkish invasion of Cyprus. There have been claims of air combat between Greek F-5s and Turkish F-102s above the Aegean Sea during the Turkish invasion. A Greek internet website editor, Demetrius Stergiou, claims that the Greek F-5s had shot down two Turkish F-102s, while the Turkish side has claimed that their F-102s had shot down two Greek F-5s; however, both Greece and Turkey still officially deny any aircraft losses. The F-102 was finally retired from both of those air forces in 1979.

The F-102 left U.S. service in 1976, while the last QF-102A / PQM-102B drone was expended in 1986. No F-102s remain in flyable condition today, although many can be seen at museums or as permanent static displays as gate guardians at Air Force and Air National Guard installations.

Variants
YF-102
Prototypes. Non area-ruled fuselage. Powered by 14,500 lbf (64.5 kN) J57-P-11, two built.
YF-102A
Area-ruled prototypes. Powered by 16,000 lbf (71.2 kN) J57-P-23. Four converted from pre-production aircraft.
F-102A
Production Model. Initial eight pre-production aircraft built with non-area ruled fuselage. Remainder built (879) with area ruled fuselage.
TF-102A
Two-seat training version, 111 built.
F-102B
The original designation of the F-106A.
F-102C
Proposed tactical attack version with J57-P-47 engine. Two converted As, as YF-102C engineering test beds.
QF-102ATarget drones converted from the F-102A. Six built.
PQM-102A Unpiloted target drones. 65 converted.
PQM-102B Revised target drone conversion, capable of being flown remotely or by pilot in cockpit. 146 converted.

Operators

Hellenic Air Force

In 1969, Greece acquired 24 of these aircraft for use by the 114th Combat Wing at Tanagra Air Base. 19 of them were single-seat F-102As, five were two-seat TF-102As. They served with the Greek air force until 1977, when the F-102s were replaced by Mirage F1CG fighters.

Turkish Air Force

Beginning in 1968, approximately 50 F-102As and TF-102As were transferred to Turkey from USAF stocks. Before transfer to Turkey, they were overhauled by CASA in Seville. They were initially assigned to the 191st Filo (Squadron) based at Murted, replacing the F-84F Thunderstreaks previously assigned to this unit. This unit was redesignated 142nd Filo in early 1973. In 1971, F-102s were also assigned to the 182nd Filo based at Diyarbakır, replacing the F-84Fs previously being flown by this unit. F-102s remained in service with these two squadrons until mid-1979, when they were replaced by the F-104G in the 142nd Filo and by the F-100C in the 182nd Filo.

United States Air Force

Air Defense Command / Aerospace Defense Command
2nd Fighter-Interceptor Squadron – Suffolk County AFB (1956–1959)
5th Fighter-Interceptor Squadron – Suffolk County AFB (1956–1960)
11th Fighter-Interceptor Squadron – Duluth AFB (1956–1960)
18th Fighter-Interceptor Squadron – Wurtsmith AFB (1957–1960)
27th Fighter-Interceptor Squadron – Griffiss AFB (1957–1959)
31st Fighter-Interceptor Squadron – Wurtsmith AFB (1956–1957); transferred to Alaska Air Command
37th Fighter-Interceptor Squadron – Ethan Allen AFB (1957–1960)
47th Fighter-Interceptor Squadron – Niagara Falls AFB (1958–1960)
48th Fighter-Interceptor Squadron – Langley AFB (1957–1960)
57th Fighter-Interceptor Squadron – Naval Station Keflavik (1962–1973)
59th Fighter-Interceptor Squadron – Goose Bay AFB(1960–1966)
61st Fighter-Interceptor Squadron – Truax Field (1957–1960)
64th Fighter-Interceptor Squadron – McChord AFB (1957–1960), Paine Field (1960–1966)
71st Fighter-Interceptor Squadron – Selfridge AFB (1958–1960)
76th Fighter-Interceptor Squadron – Westover AFB (1961–1963)
82d Fighter-Interceptor Squadron  – Travis AFB (1957–1966)
86th Fighter-Interceptor Squadron – Youngstown AFB (1957–1960)
87th Fighter-Interceptor Squadron – Lockbourne AFB (1958–1960)
95th Fighter-Interceptor Squadron – Andrews AFB (1958–1959)
317th Fighter-Interceptor Squadron – McChord AFB (1957–1958)
318th Fighter-Interceptor Squadron – McChord AFB (1957–1960)
323d Fighter-Interceptor Squadron – Truax Field (1956–1957), Harmon AFB (1957–1960)
325th Fighter-Interceptor Squadron – Truax Field (1957–1966)
326th Fighter-Interceptor Squadron – Richards-Gebaur AFB (1957–1967)
327th Fighter-Interceptor Squadron – George AFB (1956–1958), Thule AB (1958–1960)
329th Fighter-Interceptor Squadron – George AFB (1958–1960)
331st Fighter-Interceptor Squadron – Webb AFB (1960–1963)
332nd Fighter-Interceptor Squadron – McGuire AFB (1957–1959), England AFB (1959–1960), Thule AB (1960–1965)
438th Fighter-Interceptor Squadron – Kincheloe AFB (1957–1960)
456th Fighter-Interceptor Squadron – Castle AFB (1958–1960)
460th Fighter-Interceptor Squadron – Portland AFB (1958–1966)
482nd Fighter-Interceptor Squadron – Seymour Johnson AFB (1956–1965)
498th Fighter-Interceptor Squadron – Geiger Field (1957–1959)
Alaskan Air Command
317th Fighter-Interceptor Squadron – Elmendorf AFB (1958–1970)
31st Fighter-Interceptor Squadron – Elmendorf AFB (1957–1958)
United States Air Forces in Europe
32d Fighter-Interceptor Squadron – Soesterberg AB (1960–1969)
431st Fighter-Interceptor Squadron – Zaragosa AB (1960–1964)
496th Fighter-Interceptor Squadron – Hahn AB (1960–1970)
497th Fighter-Interceptor Squadron – Torrejon AB (1960–1963)
525th Fighter-Interceptor Squadron – Bitburg AB (1959–1969)
526th Fighter-Interceptor Squadron – Ramstein AB (1960–1970)
Pacific Air Forces
4th Fighter-Interceptor Squadron – Misawa AB (1957–1965)
16th Fighter-Interceptor Squadron – Naha AB (1959–1965)
40th Fighter-Interceptor Squadron – Yokota AB (1957–1965)
64th Fighter-Interceptor Squadron – Clark AB (1966–1969)
68th Fighter-Interceptor Squadron – Itazuke AB (1957–1965)
82d Fighter-Interceptor Squadron – Naha AB (1966–1971)
509th Fighter-Interceptor Squadron – Clark AB (1959–1970)
Air National Guard
102d Fighter-Interceptor Squadron, NY ANG – Suffolk County ANGB (1972–1975)
111th Fighter-Interceptor Squadron, TX ANG – Ellington Field (1960–1975)
116th Fighter-Interceptor Squadron, WA ANG – Geiger Field (1965–1969)
118th Fighter-Interceptor Squadron, CT ANG – Bradley ANGB (1966–1971)
122nd Fighter-Interceptor Squadron, LA ANG – NAS New Orleans (1960–1971)
123d Fighter-Interceptor Squadron, OR ANG – Portland ANGB (1966–1971)
132nd Fighter-Interceptor Squadron, ME ANG – Bangor ANGB (1969–1970)
134th Fighter-Interceptor Squadron, VT ANG – Burlington ANGB (1965–1975)
146th Fighter-Interceptor Squadron, PA ANG – Pittsburgh AP (1961–1975)
151st Fighter-Interceptor Squadron, TN ANG – McGhee-Tyson ANGB (1963–1964)
152d Fighter-Interceptor Squadron, AZ ANG – Tucson ANGB (1966–1969)
157th Fighter-Interceptor Squadron, SC ANG – MacEntire ANGB (1963–1975)
159th Fighter-Interceptor Squadron, FL ANG – Imeson Field (1960–1968), Jacksonville ANGB 1968–1974
175th Fighter-Interceptor Squadron, SD ANG – Sioux Falls AFB (1960–1970)
176th Fighter-Interceptor Squadron, WI ANG – Truax Field (1966–1974)
178th Fighter-Interceptor Squadron, ND ANG – Hector Field (1966–1969)
179th Fighter-Interceptor Squadron, MN ANG – Duluth ANGB (1966–1971)
182nd Fighter-Interceptor Squadron, TX ANG – Kelly AFB (1960–1969)
186th Fighter-Interceptor Squadron, MT ANG – Great Falls ANGB (1966–1972)
190th Fighter-Interceptor Squadron, ID ANG – Gowen Field (1964–1975)
194th Fighter-Interceptor Squadron, CA ANG – Fresno ANGB (1964–1974)
196th Fighter-Interceptor Squadron, CA ANG – Ontario IAP (1965–1975)
199th Fighter-Interceptor Squadron, HI ANG – Hickam AFB (1960–1977)
National Aeronautics and Space Administration
Four F-102 (likely TF-102B versions) were provided to NASA for use by the Mercury astronauts.

Aircraft on display

Canada
F-102A
 56-1266 – Stephenville, Newfoundland. This aircraft was formerly of the U.S. 59th Fighter Interceptor Squadron, Goose Bay (Happy Valley), Labrador.

Greece
F-102A
 56-1106 – Tanagra.
 56-1232 – Larisa.

TF-102A
 56-2355 – Hellenic Air Force Museum Tatoi
 55-4035 = Hellenic Air Force Museum Tatoi.

Netherlands
F-102A
 Registration unknown - On display at the Nationaal Militair Museum, Soesterberg. Former Greek aircraft, painted as 56-1032, 32nd FIS USAF.

Turkey

F-102A
 55-3386 – Istanbul Aviation Museum.

TF-102A
 56-2368 – Istanbul Aviation Museum.

United States
YF-102A
 53-1787 – Air Park at Jackson Barracks Military Museum, New Orleans, Louisiana
 53-1788 – Carolinas Aviation Museum, Charlotte, North Carolina.

TF-102A
 54-1351 – Selfridge Military Air Museum, Selfridge ANGB, Mount Clemens, Michigan.
 54-1353 – Century Circle at Edwards Air Force Base, near Rosamond, California
 54-1366 – Pima Air and Space Museum adjacent to Davis-Monthan AFB in Tucson, Arizona.
 56-2317 – Grissom Air Museum, Grissom Air Reserve Base (former Grissom AFB), Peru, Indiana.
 56-2337 – Fort Worth Aviation Museum, Fort Worth, Texas.
 56-2346 – Pennsylvania National Guard Military Museum, Pennsylvania National Guard Headquarters, Fort Indiantown Gap, Pennsylvania. (Aircraft was assigned to the Pennsylvania Air National Guard, at the 112th Fighter Interceptor Group, Pittsburgh International Airport, Coraopolis, Pennsylvania from 1960–1974 and is on loan from the National Museum of the United States Air Force).
 56-2352 – Southern Museum of Flight, Birmingham, Alabama.
 56-2353 – Wisconsin National Guard Memorial Library and Museum, Volk Field, Camp Douglas, Wisconsin.
 56-2364 – Castle Air Museum, Atwater, California.

F-102A
 53-1801 – Joe Foss Field Air National Guard Station - 114th Fighter Wing, Sioux Falls, South Dakota.
 53-1804 – Fresno Air National Guard Base - 144th Fighter Wing, Fresno, California.
 53-1816 – Boise Idaho Military History Museum, Boise, Idaho.

 54-1405 – Strategic Air and Space Museum, Ashland, Nebraska
 54-1373 – Hickam AFB, Honolulu, Hawaii.
 55-3366 – Pacific Aviation Museum, Ford Island, Honolulu, Hawaii.
 56-0984 – Wings Over the Rockies Museum, (former Lowry AFB) Denver, Colorado.
 56-0985 – McEntire Air National Guard Base, South Carolina

 56-0986 – MAPS Air Museum, Akron-Canton Regional Airport, Ohio.
 56-1017 – South Dakota Air and Space Museum, Ellsworth AFB, Rapid City, South Dakota.
 56-1053, (painted as 56-1274), – Alaska Heritage Park, Elmendorf AFB, Alaska.
 56-1105 – Lions Park in Great Falls, Montana.
 56-1109 – Peterson AFB, Colorado Springs, Colorado.
 56-1114 – March Field Air Museum, March ARB (former March AFB), Riverside, California.
 56-1115 – Fairchild AFB, Spokane, Washington.
 56-1134 – Arizona ANGB, Tucson, Arizona.
 56-1140 – Aerospace Museum of California, former McClellan AFB, Sacramento, California.
 56-1151 – Museum of Aviation, Robins AFB, Warner Robins, Georgia.
 56-1219 – Empire State Aerosciences Museum, Schenectady County Airport, New York.
 56-1252 – Ellington Field Joint Reserve Base, Houston, Texas. Future President of the United States George W. Bush flew this model with the 147th Fighter Interceptor Group, 111th Fighter Interceptor Squadron of the Texas Air National Guard in the early 1970s.  It is mounted on a pole that exits the burner.  His name is on the canopy.
 56-1264 – Connecticut ANGB - 103rd FW, Windsor Locks, Connecticut.
 56-1268 – San Diego Air and Space Museum, Gillespie Field, El Cajon, California.
 56-1273 – Wisconsin National Guard Memorial Library and Museum, Volk Field, Camp Douglas, Wisconsin.
 56-1282 – Transportation and Industry Museum of Alaska, Wasilla, Alaska.
 56-1325, (painted as 56-1476), – Minnesota Air National Guard Base, Minneapolis, Minnesota
 56-1368 – Evergreen Aviation Museum, McMinnville, Oregon.
 56-1393 – Pima Air and Space Museum adjacent to Davis-Monthan AFB in Tucson, Arizona.
 56-1413 – Castle Air Museum (former Castle AFB), Atwater, California.
 56-1415 – Pittsburgh IAP Air Reserve Station (located at Pittsburgh International Airport), Pittsburgh, Pennsylvania. Refurbished in 2010

 56-1416 – National Museum of the United States Air Force, Wright-Patterson Air Force Base near Dayton, Ohio.
 56-1427 – Travis AFB Heritage Center, Travis AFB, Fairfield, California.
 56-1502, (painted as 55-3432), - North Dakota ANGB - 119TH FG, Fargo, North Dakota.
 56-1505 – Minot AFB, Minot, North Dakota.
 56-1515 – McChord Air Museum, McChord Air Force Base, Washington.
 57-0788 – Long Island MacArthur Airport, Long Island, New York.
 57-0817, (painted as 56-1357), - Florida Air National Guard Base -  125th Fighter Wing, Jacksonville, Florida.
 57-0826 – Sheppard AFB, Wichita Falls, Texas.

 57-0833 – Hill Aerospace Museum, Hill AFB, Utah.
 57-0858 – Burlington Air National Guard Base, Burlington, Vermont.
 57-0906 – Museum of Aviation, Warner Robins AFB, Macon, Georgia.

Specifications (F-102A)

See also

References

Notes

Citations

Bibliography

 
 Drendel, Lou. Century Series in Color (Fighting Colors). Carrollton, Texas: Squadron/Signal Publications, 1980. .
 Green, William. The World's Fighting Planes. London: Macdonald, 1964.
 Gunston, Bill. "Convair F-102: An Analysis of America's Home-defence Interceptor". Flight, 19 April 1957, pp. 512–518.
 Gunston, Bill. Fighters of the Fifties. North Branch, Minnesota: Specialty Press Publishers & Wholesalers, Inc., 1981. .
 Hobson, Chris. Vietnam Air Losses: United States Air Force, Navy and Marine Corps Fixed-Wing Aircraft Losses in Southeast Asia, 1961–73. North Branch, Minnesota: Specialty Press, 2001. .
 Jenkins, Dennis R. and Tony R. Landis. Experimental & Prototype U.S. Air Force Jet Fighters. North Branch, Minnesota, USA: Specialty Press, 2008. .
 
 Mendenhall, Charles A. Delta Wings: Convair's High-Speed Planes of the Fifties and Sixties. Motorbooks. 1983.
 Pace, Steve. X-Fighters: USAF Experimental and Prototype Fighters, XP-59 to YF-23. St. Paul, Minnesota: Motorbooks International, 1991. .
 Peacock, Lindsay. "Convair's Delta Defender: The F-102 Story". Air International, Vol. 30, No. 1, January 1986, pp. 28–37, 52. .
 Taylor, Michael J. H., ed. "The Convair Delta Dagger". Jane's American Fighting Aircraft of the 20th Century. New York: Modern Publishing, 1995. .
 Wegg, John. General Dynamics Aircraft and their Predecessors. London: Putnam, 1990. .
 Winchester, Jim, ed. "Convair F-102 Delta Dagger." Military Aircraft of the Cold War (The Aviation Factfile). London: Grange Books plc, 2006. .

External links

 Aerospaceweb's Profile of the F-102
 Global Aircraft's F-102 Specs., Achievements, and Photos
 Joe Baugher's F-102 Delta Dagger History
 Aero-Web: List of F-102 Delta Dagger on display in the US.

F-102
Tailless delta-wing aircraft
Convair F-102 Delta Dagger
Single-engined jet aircraft
Aircraft first flown in 1953
Low-wing aircraft
Second-generation jet fighters